The black-bellied firefinch (Lagonosticta rara) is a common species of estrildid finch found in Africa. It has an estimated global extent of occurrence of 2,300,000 km2.

It is found in Benin, Burkina Faso, Cameroon, Central African Republic, Chad, The Democratic Republic of the Congo, Côte d'Ivoire, Ghana, Guinea, Kenya, Liberia, Nigeria, Senegal, Sierra Leone, South Sudan, Togo and Uganda. The status of the species is evaluated as Least Concern.

References

BirdLife Species Factsheet

black-bellied firefinch
Birds of Sub-Saharan Africa
black-bellied firefinch